The Information Management Body of Knowledge (IMBOK) is a management framework that organizes the concept of Information Management in the full context of business and organizational strategy, management and operations.  It is specifically intended to provide researchers and practicing managers with a tool that makes clear the conjunction of the worlds of information technology and the world at large.

The IMBOK framework

The IMBOK comprises six 'knowledge' areas and four 'process' areas.  The knowledge areas identify domains of management expertise and capability that are each distinctly different to the others, as shown in the figure.  The process areas identify critical activities that move the value from the left to the right.  For example:
 Projects transform Information technology into information systems by engineering technology components into systems that deliver the required functionality
 Business change management deploys information systems in business processes so as to improve the performance and capability of those business processes
 Business operations deliver the business benefits expected by stakeholders 
 Performance management ensures and oversees the delivery of benefits appropriate to an organization's strategic intentions.

Origin

The IMBOK was a major deliverable out of a research project at the University of the Western Cape in South Africa, funded by the Carnegie Corporation of New York.  It has been adopted as a standard Information Management and Information Systems course text in South Africa, Europe, North America and elsewhere.  A monograph describing the IMBOK was made available on the World Wide Web in 2004, but it has been withdrawn and republished in an extended form in a book:  "Investing in Information".

Community

The Community web site at IMBOK.ORG has lapsed and the content is now available at IMBOK.INFO.

See also

 Information management
 Records management

External links 
 Supporting website for the IMBOK Community

References

Information management
Information systems
Works about information